Harry Evers Bryant (9 January 1906 – 17 November 1963) was a rugby union player who represented Australia. Bryant, a number eight, was born in Sydney and claimed a total of 3 international rugby caps for Australia in 1925. He attended Newington College (1917–1923). Bryant died in Cronulla, New South Wales, aged 57.

References

1906 births
1963 deaths
People educated at Newington College
Australian rugby union players
Australia international rugby union players
Rugby union players from Sydney
Rugby union number eights